North Lake Early College High School, also known as North Lake Collegiate Academy, is a public high school located in Dallas County, Texas and operated by the Dallas Independent School District (DISD). It has a campus for 9th and 10th grade students at the main campus at North Lake College in Irving and will have a campus for 11th and 12th grade students in the future. Under Texas law, DISD can have operations, including schools, outside of its own boundaries, and North Lake College is not in the DISD boundaries. The school opened with grade 9 students in 2019 and will expand by one grade level per year.

References

External links
 North Lake Early College High School

Dallas Independent School District high schools
High schools in Irving, Texas
2019 establishments in Texas
Educational institutions established in 2019
University-affiliated schools in the United States
Early College High Schools